Karatay is a town and district of Konya Province in the Central Anatolia region of Turkey. Karatay is one of the central districts of Konya along with the districts of Meram and Selçuklu. According to 2000 census, population of the district is 214,589 of which 183,677 live in the urban center of Karatay.

The solar power plant Kızören in Konya which went online in 2016 covers an area of 430,000 m2 and will be able to produce 26 GWh of electricity annually.

Places to see
Mevlana Museum
Aziziye Mosque

Twin cities
  Novi Pazar, Serbia

References

External links
 District governor's official website 
 District municipality's official website 
 

Populated places in Konya Province
Districts of Konya Province
Lycaonia